Geneviève Brisac (born 18 October 1951, in Paris) is a French writer.

She is the winner of the Prix Femina in 1996 for Week-end de chasse à la mère, a novel translated in English as Losing Eugenio (2000) and referred to in The New York Times as a "mildly compelling text" and in Publishers Weekly as an "elegant narrative art".

She also writes short stories and children's literature, and is a literary critic for Le Monde, and with Christophe Honoré she co-wrote the screenplay for Honoré's Non Ma Fille, Tu N'iras pas Danser (2009). Plagued by anorexia from childhood, she wrote an "auto-fictional" novel, Petite (1994), in which she recounts her struggle with the disease.

She became very interested in Virginia Woolf, publishing V. W.: le mélange des genres (V. W .: the mixture of genres, with Agnès Desarthe, Paris: Éditions de l'Olivier, 2004), republished under the title of La double vie de Virginia Woolf (Paris: Points, 2008).

Writer, editor, close to the NGO "Bibliothèques Sans Frontières" ("Libraries Without Borders"), she declared her love for books: "Books have saved my life several times. My debt is unlimited.".

Publications 
 Madame Placard, Paris, Gallimard, 1989.
 Les filles, Paris, Gallimard, 1997.
 Week-end de chasse à la mère, Paris, Seuil, 1998.
 Une année avec mon père, Paris, Éd. de l'Olivier, 2010.
 Pour qui vous prenez-vous ?, Paris, Éd. de l'Olivier, 2001.
 Petite, Paris, Éditions Points, 2015.

References

1951 births
Living people
Writers from Paris
French women novelists
Prix Femina winners
20th-century French novelists
French women screenwriters
French screenwriters
French children's writers
French women short story writers
French short story writers
Officiers of the Ordre des Arts et des Lettres
French women children's writers
20th-century French women writers
20th-century short story writers